Dan Bakkedahl (born November 18, 1969) is an American actor and improvisational comedian. He is best known for starring as Tim Hughes on the CBS sitcom Life in Pieces, as Congressman Roger Furlong on the HBO series Veep, and as Steve Nugent in the FX comedy series Legit. From 2005 to 2007, he was a correspondent for three seasons on The Daily Show with Jon Stewart. He additionally has recurring roles on the ABC sitcom The Goldbergs, the HBO Max comedy series Made for Love, and the Netflix comedy Space Force.

Early life and education
Bakkedahl was born in Rochester, Minnesota, and was raised in Stuart, Florida. He is a 1988 graduate of Martin County High School. He is of part Norwegian descent. Bakkedahl attended St. Cloud State University in Minnesota, before completing his studies at Florida State University, where he was a member of the Chi Phi fraternity.

Career 
After college, Bakkedahl toured for a year with the Repertory Theater of America. After moving to Chicago, he made a name for himself at the Improv Olympic performing in the influential two-man improv show ZUMPF with his teacher Miles Stroth. Dan went on to perform at the Second City mainstage, eventually writing Doors Open on the Right, Second City’s 90th revue. In Chicago, he is often noted for having left the Second City mainstage due to artistic differences.

Bakkedahl continues to perform regularly at comedy venues such as the Upright Citizens Brigade Theatre, Magnet Theater, Second City and Improv Comedy Lab in Los Angeles. He is also a member of the advisory council of the California Shakespeare Theater.

Bakkedahl's first major television work was on Comedy Central's The Daily Show where he served as a correspondent from 2005 to 2007. After leaving The Daily Show in 2007, he has since moved to Los Angeles and went on to have supporting roles in the films such as Observe and Report, The Heat, and This Is 40. He also appeared in the Snake 'N Bacon animated special on Adult Swim, which aired on May 10, 2009. In early 2010, he co-starred in the comedy pilot Our Show on NBC.

From 2010 through 2011, Bakkedahl appeared in a series of commercials for T-Mobile cellular phones, where he plays a human likeness of AT&T's 3G network.

Bakkedahl has made guest appearances on shows such as 30 Rock, Curb Your Enthusiasm, Newsreaders, and The United States of Tara, as well as appearing in recurring roles as "Murray the A/C Repairman" in season three of Community and as Congressman Furlong on Veep. In 2015, he began recurring roles The Goldbergs as science teacher Mr. Woodburn and on The Mindy Project as Dr. Adrian Bergdahl.

Bakkedahl starred alongside Jim Jeffries and DJ Qualls in the FX comedy series Legit, which ran for two seasons on FX and FXX. Aftwards, he next starred as Tim Hughes on the CBS sitcom Life in Pieces, which began airing in 2015 and concluded after four seasons in 2019.

Bakkedahl co-stars in the HBO Max comedy series Made for Love, which premiered on April 1, 2021.

Filmography

Film

Television

Other work

References

External links
 
 
 
 
 

1969 births
American male comedians
American male film actors
American male television actors
American male voice actors
American people of Norwegian descent
Florida State University alumni
Living people
Male actors from Florida
Male actors from Minnesota
People from Stuart, Florida
People from Rochester, Minnesota
21st-century American male actors
St. Cloud State University alumni
21st-century American comedians
Comedians from Florida
Comedians from Minnesota
Martin County High School alumni